Grav is a free software, self-hosted content management system (CMS) written in the PHP programming language and based on the Symfony web application framework. It uses a flat file database for both backend and frontend.

Grav is designed to have a shallow learning curve, and to be easy to set up.  The focus of Grav is speed and simplicity, rather than an abundance of built-in features that come at the expense of complexity.

The name Grav is a shortened version of the word "gravity".

Grav is the most starred PHP CMS on GitHub, with over 13,700 stars.

Awards 
 CMS Critic Awards - Best Flat File CMS 2021
 CMS Critic Awards - Best Flat File CMS 2020
 CMS Critic Awards - Best Flat File CMS 2019
 CMS Critic Awards - Best Flat File CMS 2017
 CMS Critic Awards - Best Open Source CMS 2016

See also

 Content management system
 List of content management systems

References

Content management systems
Free content management systems
Free software
Free_software_programmed_in_PHP